The 48th annual Venice International Film Festival was held on 3 to 14 September 1991.

Jury
The following people comprised the 1991 jury:
Gian Luigi Rondi head of jury
Silvia D'Amico Bendico
James Belushi
John Boorman
Michel Ciment
Moritz de Hadeln
Naum Kleiman
Oja Kodar
Pilar Miró

Official selection

In competition

Autonomous sections

Venice International Film Critics' Week
The following feature films were selected to be screened as In Competition for this section:
 Railway Bar (Bar des rails) by Cédric Kahn (France)
 Drive by Jefery Levy (United States)
 The Sky Above Paris (Le ciel de Paris) by Michel Béna (France)
 Nowhere Man (Muno no hito) by Naoto Takenaka (Japan)
 Clouds (Nuvem) by Ana Luísa Guimarães (Portugal)
 The Intruder (Razlucnica) by Amir Karakulov (Soviet Union)
 Scorpion’s Garden (Sady skorpiona) by Oleg Kovalov (Soviet Union)
 Vito And The Others (Vito e gli altri) by Antonio Capuano (Italy)
 Waiting by Jackie McKimmie (Australia, United Kingdom)

Awards
Golden Lion:
Close to Eden by Nikita Mikhalkov
 Grand Special Jury Prize:
A Divina Comédia''' by Manoel de Oliveira
Silver Lion:The Fisher King by Terry GilliamRaise the Red Lantern by Yimou ZhangJ'entends plus la guitare by Philippe Garrel
Golden Osella:
Best Screenplay - Mississippi Masala by Sooni Taraporevala
Volpi Cup:
Best Actor - River Phoenix (My Own Private Idaho)
Best Actress - Tilda Swinton (Edward II)
The President of the Italian Senate's Gold Medal:
Jean-Luc Godard (Allemagne année 90 neuf zéro)
Career Golden Lion:
Gian Maria Volonté
Golden Ciak:
Best Film - Mississippi Masala by Mira Nair
Best Actor - Vittorio Mezzogiorno (Cerro Torre: Schrei aus Stein)
Best Actress - Glenn Close (Meeting Venus)
FIPRESCI Prize:Nowhere Man by Naoto Takenaka
OCIC Award:Close to Eden by Nikita Mikhalkov
OCIC Award - Honorable Mention:
Luigi Faccini
Pasinetti Award:
Best Film - Close to Eden by Nikita Mikhalkov
Best Actor - Vittorio Mezzogiorno (Cerro Torre: Schrei aus Stein)
Best Actress - Mercedes Ruehl (The Fisher King)
Pietro Bianchi Award:
Paolo Taviani
Vittorio Taviani
Little Golden Lion:The Fisher King by Terry Gilliam
Evira Notari Prize:Raise the Red Lantern'' by Yimou Zhang

References

External links

Venice Film Festival 1991 Awards on IMDb

Venice
Venice Film Festival
1991 film festivals
Film
Venice
September 1991 events in Europe